The Symphony No. 3 of Roger Sessions was written in 1957. It was a result of a commission by the Koussevitzky Foundation to celebrate the 75th anniversary of the Boston Symphony Orchestra, and was premiered by the Boston Symphony on December 6, 1957, conducted by Charles Munch.  Sessions later was commissioned by the Boston Symphony on their centenary, when he provided them with his Concerto for Orchestra (premiered 1981). Andrea Olmstead describes all of Sessions's symphonies as "serious" and "funereal", with No. 3 being one of four with, "quiet reflective endings."

Instrumentation

It is scored for three flutes, three oboes, four clarinets, three bassoons, four horns, two trumpets, three trombones, one tuba, timpani, percussion, a celesta, a harp and strings.

Structure

It is in four movements: 
Allegro grazioso e con fuoco
Allegro, un poco ruvido
Andante sostenuto e con affetto
Allegro con fuoco

Recordings
Igor Buketoff, Royal Philharmonic Orchestra (1968?, RCA) (CRI CD)

References

Further reading
 Imbrie, Andrew (1972). "The Symphonies of Roger Sessions". Tempo (new series), no. 103 (December): 24–32.
Koh, Tse-Ying (1995). "The Twelve-Tone Method and the Classical Tradition in Roger Sessions' Symphony No. 3". M.M. thesis. Houston: Rice University.

Symphonies by Roger Sessions
1957 compositions
Music commissioned by the Boston Symphony Orchestra